Eulalia (c. 290 – February 12, 303), co-patron saint of Barcelona, was a 13-year-old Roman Christian virgin who was martyred in Barcelona during the persecution of Christians in the reign of emperor Diocletian (although the Sequence of Saint Eulalia mentions the "pagan king" Maximian). There is some dispute as to whether she is the same person as Eulalia of Mérida, whose story is similar.

History

Eulalia, age thirteen, was the daughter of a noble family that lived near the city of Barcelona. Amid the persecutions under Diocletian, governor Dacian arrived in the city intent on enforcing the decrees. Sometime later, Eulalia left her home, entered the city and confronted the governor for his merciless persecution of Christians. Unable to dismiss the eloquent arguments of a young girl, Dacian soon had Eulalia stripped nearly naked and flagellated, which was followed by bloodier tortures that were not to cease unless she admitted the error of her ways. Resisting to the end, she prayed that God would take her to Heaven, and died of her wounds.

A dove is supposed to have flown forth from her mouth following her death. Then, a sudden snowstorm covered her body like a garment.

It is traditionally believed that her tortures culminated in her crucifixion on an X-shaped cross, and she is depicted with this cross as the instrument of her martyrdom. However, it has been posited that she was instead publicly tortured to death on an X frame and her body left on display, artistic depictions of this leading to the later belief that she was crucified.

Veneration
There are a number of similarities with the description of the martyrdom of Eulalia of Mérida.

Her body was originally interred in the church of Santa Maria de les Arenes (St. Mary of the Sands; now Santa Maria del Mar, St. Mary of the Sea). It was hidden in 713 during the Moorish invasion, and only recovered in 878. In 1339, it was relocated to an alabaster sarcophagus in the crypt of the newly built Cathedral of Santa Eulalia. The festival of Saint Eulalia is held in Barcelona for a week around her feast day on February 12.

Eulalia is commemorated with statues and street names throughout Barcelona. For example, Eulalia is traditionally believed to have been placed in a barrel with shards of glass and rolled down the street named Baixada de Santa Eulàlia ("Saint Eulalia's descent").

See also
Sequence of Saint Eulalia – French hagiography from AD 880
Saint Eulalia of Barcelona, patron saint archive

References

External links
St. Eulalia of Barcelona from the Catholic Encyclopedia
Saint of the Day, February 12: Eulalia of Barcelona  at SaintPatrickDC.org
St. Eulalia page at the Christian Iconography web site

Catalan saints
Saints from Hispania
Christian child saints
Spanish children
290 births
303 deaths
Burials at Barcelona Cathedral
4th-century Christian martyrs
3rd-century Roman women
4th-century Roman women
People executed by crucifixion
Christians martyred during the reign of Diocletian